Edward Doro (February 3, 1909 – 1987) was an American poet.

Life
Doro was born in Dickinson, North Dakota, the son of a Californian banker. He studied at the University of Southern California (B.A., 1929) and the University of Pennsylvania (M.A., 1931). Doro later moved to Arizona.

Awards
 1936 Guggenheim Fellowship
 1939 Russell Loines Award for Poetry, by American Academy of Arts and Letters

Works
 Alms for oblivion, Casa editorial Franco-ibero-americana, 1932
 The Boar and Shibboleth: with other poems, woods engravings Paul Landacre, Alfred A. Knopf, 1933
 Mr. Zenith: & other poems, The Bookman press, 1942
 Shiloh: fragments on a famous theme, G. P. Putnam, 1936
 Mr. Zenith & Other Poems, Bookman Press, 1942
 Parisian interlude, W. Doan, 1960
 The furtherance, Franconia College Press, 1966

Anthologies
 Twentieth-century American poetry, Editor Conrad Aiken, Modern Library, 1963

Reviews
THIS book of poems, beautifully printed and illustrated with some fine wood engravings, is, in good part, a reprint of Mr. Doro's poems first published by the poet himself about two years ago in Paris. But to this first American edition several poems have been added and they make all the difference.

References

Year of birth unknown
Year of death unknown
People from Dickinson, North Dakota
University of Southern California alumni
University of Pennsylvania alumni
1909 births
1987 deaths
20th-century American poets